Vedantam Ramalinga Sastry is an Indian classical dancer in Kuchipudi. He won the Sangeet Natak Akademi Award in 2012 for his research on Kuchipudi dance form. He is the Principal of Siddhendra Yogi Kuchipudi Kalapeetham.

References

Recipients of the Sangeet Natak Akademi Award
Dance teachers
Kuchipudi exponents
Living people
Year of birth missing (living people)